Peder Alsvik (26 June 1882 – 31 December 1964) was a Norwegian politician for the Labour Party.

He was born in Aure.

He was elected to the Norwegian Parliament from Møre og Romsdal in 1937, and was re-elected on two occasions. He had previously served in the position of deputy representative during the terms 1931–1933 and 1934–1936.

On the local level Alsvik was a member of Bremsnes municipality council from 1916 to 1919 and 1925 to 1934.

References

1882 births
1964 deaths
Members of the Storting
Labour Party (Norway) politicians
Møre og Romsdal politicians
20th-century Norwegian politicians
People from Aure, Norway